is a Japanese football player. He plays for AC Nagano Parceiro.

Career
Kento Kawata joined J1 League club Omiya Ardija in 2016. On June 6, he debuted in J.League Cup (v Shonan Bellmare).

Club statistics
Updated to 22 February 2018.

References

External links
Profile at Tochigi SC

1997 births
Living people
Association football people from Fukuoka Prefecture
Japanese footballers
J1 League players
J2 League players
J3 League players
Omiya Ardija players
Thespakusatsu Gunma players
Tochigi SC players
AC Nagano Parceiro players
Association football forwards